Albert Deborgies (6 July 1902 – 6 June 1984) was a French water polo player who competed in the 1924 Summer Olympics. He was part of the French team which won the gold medal. He played all four matches.

See also
 France men's Olympic water polo team records and statistics
 List of Olympic champions in men's water polo
 List of Olympic medalists in water polo (men)

References

External links
 

1902 births
1984 deaths
Sportspeople from Tourcoing
French male water polo players
Water polo players at the 1924 Summer Olympics
Olympic water polo players of France
Olympic gold medalists for France
Olympic medalists in water polo
Medalists at the 1924 Summer Olympics
20th-century French people